Governor Haines may refer to:

Daniel Haines (1801–1877), Governor of New Jersey
John M. Haines (1863–1917), Governor of Idaho
William T. Haines (1854–1919), Governor of Maine